The Junior men's race at the 1985 IAAF World Cross Country Championships was held in Lisbon, Portugal, at the Sports Complex of Jamor on March 24, 1985.   A report on the event was given in the Glasgow Herald.

Complete results, medallists, 
 and the results of British athletes were published.

Race results

Junior men's race (8.19 km)

Individual

Teams

Note: Athletes in parentheses did not score for the team result

Participation
An unofficial count yields the participation of 141 athletes from 35 countries in the Junior men's race, two athletes less than the official number published.

 (5)
 (6)
 (4)
 (6)
 (5)
 (6)
 (6)
 (1)
 (6)
 (2)
 (6)
 (2)
 (5)
 (1)
 (5)
 (4)
 (3)
 (2)
 (1)
 (6)
 (1)
 (3)
 (1)
 (6)
 (6)
 (5)
 (6)
 (6)
 (2)
 (1)
 (5)
 (1)
 (6)
 (6)
 (4)

See also
 1985 IAAF World Cross Country Championships – Senior men's race
 1985 IAAF World Cross Country Championships – Senior women's race

References

Junior men's race at the World Athletics Cross Country Championships
IAAF World Cross Country Championships
1985 in youth sport